Amoretti, Welty, Helmer & Co Bank is a historic building located in the town of Dubois, Fremont County, Wyoming. Built-in 1911-13,  it is listed on the National Register of Historic Places.

History 
Frank A. Welty Sr. and others built the one-story bank in 1911-13. The structure of the building features a flat roof and a short parapet and it is built with locally sourced red sandstone. The bank's construction began in 1911, and it opened for business in 1913. As the town of Dubois's first bank, it acted as a hub for financial activities and investment. The bank was operated by the town's founder Frank A. Welty and bankers, Ernest B. Helmer and Eugene Amoretti Jr.

See also 
 Welty's General Store

References

External links
Amoretti, Welty, Helmer & Co Bank at the Wyoming State Historic Preservation Office

Commercial buildings on the National Register of Historic Places in Wyoming
Commercial buildings completed in 1913
Buildings and structures in Fremont County, Wyoming
Historic American Buildings Survey in Wyoming
National Register of Historic Places in Fremont County, Wyoming
Bank buildings in Wyoming
Banks established in 1913
1913 establishments in Wyoming